Ruby Creek is a stream in the U.S. state of South Dakota.

Ruby Creek received its name from the deposits of colorful stones pioneers likened to rubies.

See also
List of rivers of South Dakota

References

Rivers of Custer County, South Dakota
Rivers of South Dakota